Damian Hess (born December 3, 1973), better known by his stage name MC Frontalot, is an American rapper and web designer.
Hess began releasing music as MC Frontalot in 1999. His first successes came through Song Fight!, an online songwriting and recording competition, where he became known for consistently beating opponents. Throughout his history at Song Fight!, he has never lost a competition as MC Frontalot, although he has entered only seven entries in that name. In one such song fight, entitled "Romantic Cheapskate", he likens Song Fight! to a neglected lover who favors him regardless of how he treats her. The song went on to garner a total of 614 votes, while the next closest song ended the round with 28.

Career

Early days
In 2000, Frontalot released the song "Nerdcore Hiphop". The song became an immediate hit in the geek and nerd communities. The rap subgenre of nerdcore, which had already been in development by various performers, embraced the title and has since been expanding rapidly.

Many consider Hess the founder of nerdcore. However, he has pointed out on his information webpage that many artists came before whom he considers his peers.

Hess released his first studio album on August 27, 2005. Entitled Nerdcore Rising, the album contained six new songs, along with 10 remixed versions of past tracks. Some of the new tracks are produced by popular online musicians from Song Fight!, including indie rock and hip hop artist Doctor Popular.

Spotlight

On March 18, 2002, popular webcomic Penny Arcade (whose creators were long-time fans of Hess) declared Frontalot their rapper laureate, directing fans to his website. He has acknowledged that single act made his popularity skyrocket.

He appeared at every Penny Arcade Expo from 2004 to 2013. "Penny Arcade Theme" and "Which MC Was That?" both appear in the dance video game In the Groove. He  is featured on the Baddd Spellah track "Rhyme of the Nibelung", which won CBC Radio 2's Remix the Ring contest.

A new track 'Final Boss' featured over the end credits in the 2008 game Penny Arcade Adventures: On the Rain-Slick Precipice of Darkness- Episode 1.

MC Frontalot appears occasionally in the webcomic Overcompensating by Jeffrey Rowland.

MC Frontalot has also been seen on commercials for G4 TV, as well as being on the show Freestyle 101 where he sang parts of his songs with freestyle lines connecting them.

Additionally, comic book illustrator Tony Moore became a fan of both Frontalot and fellow nerdcore artist MC Hawking, drawing both of them as zombies in an early issue of The Walking Dead series. Hess appears in a white shirt, tie and glasses, with the word "Front" written on his pocket protector; he is seen eating a deer.

A song written and performed by Frontalot based on the webcomic Achewood titled "Living At the Corner of Dude and Catastrophe" has been that website's theme song since 2006.  On September 2, 2008 as part of a Penny Arcade download pack, "Living At the Corner of Dude and Catastrophe" was chosen for inclusion as a downloadable track for the video game Rock Band. The week of September 14, 2009 saw the release of "Origin of Species" (a satire of Creation Science) which was included in the Penny Arcade Expo track pack.

Live performances

Although most of his fanbase is online, Hess gave a handful of live performances while living in San Francisco, and several more after moving to New York City. His first official tour started on May 12, 2006, with shows mostly in the Southeast United States. When he performs, he plays with a full ensemble, including keyboardist and frequent collaborator Gminor7, bassist Blak Lotus, and drummer The SturGENiUS. Other occasional band members include G.LATINusKY00B, The Categorical Imperative, Vic 20, and 56K. He finished a tour with Schäffer The Darklord as of 25 November 2007 and started another tour on 1 November 2008 with MC Lars and YTCracker. As of June 2010, he's been touring with alternative rock musicians, Wheatus, on their UK leg of their 10th anniversary tour; on occasion providing guest vocals on some of their live jams, as well as Wheatus offering musical accompaniment on some of his tracks.

Film and television
Hess starred as "TP Factory Rapper" in the Sesame Street direct-to-video movie Elmo's Potty Time.

Nerdcore Rising is a documentary/concert film starring Hess and various other nerdcore artists such as MC Chris, Optimus Rhyme and MC Lars with contributors such as "Weird Al" Yankovic, Prince Paul and Brian Posehn.  The film, directed and produced by Negin Farsad, premiered at the 2008 South by Southwest festival in Austin, Texas. It combines interviews about nerdcore and its origins, with footage of Frontalot's 2006 Nerdcore Rising national tour.

Hess was interviewed in Alexandre O. Philippe's documentary, The People vs. George Lucas, which premiered at the 2010 South by Southwest Film Festival. Hess attended the festival as a musician and panelist.

Hess made an appearance as a judge on the sixth episode of the first season of TBS's King of the Nerds, originally aired February 21, 2013.

Musical influences
Much of his earlier music features samples from other artists' works, many times using music acquired from famous artists such as Paul Simon, They Might Be Giants, James Brown, Fiona Apple, and many others. He addresses his borrowing of various drum beats in the song "Good Old Clyde", a song commenting on and using the popular "Funky Drummer" drum break by Clyde Stubblefield.

Since he began selling his albums commercially, Hess has collaborated on almost all his tracks with Baddd Spellah, an electronic musician and hip-hop beatsmith, and Gaby 'Gminor7' Alter, a composer and keyboardist whose playing was the basis for many of Frontalot's earlier songs. Hess has also collaborated with fellow rappers such as MC Hawking and Canadian rapper Jesse Dangerously.

Discography

Studio albums
Nerdcore Rising (2005)
Secrets from the Future (2007)
Final Boss (2008)
Zero Day (2010)
Solved (2011)
Question Bedtime (2014)
Net Split, or the Fathomless Heartbreak of Online Itself (2019)

Other releases
Nerdcore Hiphop (freely available demo)
Favoritism (greatest hits collective available exclusively in the Humble Music Bundle)
Front's Humble Remix Addendum EP (remix collective available exclusively in the Humble Music Bundle)

Non-album tracks
"24 Hours" (abandoned demo)
"Bitchslap" (by MC Hawking)
"My Sister" (by Duboce Triangle with The JBB)
"Oh, the Hilarity" (from Indie Pop Cares a Lot)
"Rappers We Crush" (with Kompressor)
"Rhyme of the Nibelung" (with Baddd Spellah)
"Romantic Cheapskate" (with Baddd Spellah for Song Fight!)
"Soda Water" (by Jess Klein)
"Oneonta (Eli Porter)" (with YTCracker and MC Lars on The Digital Gangster LP)
"O.G. Original Gamer (with MC Lars on the MC Lars album This Gigantic Robot Kills)
"Don't Wear Those Shoes" (for the "Weird Al" Yankovic tribute album Twenty-Six and a Half)
"Another First Kiss" (for the They Might Be Giants "Mink Car" tribute album marking the 10th anniversary of the World Trade Center attacks.)
"Challenge Your Audience (Featuring MC Frontalot & More or Les" (by Mikal kHill)

References

External links

Official MC Frontalot website, includes official song lyrics, news, music, and forum
Such a Scream, Hess's professional website

1973 births
Living people
West Coast hip hop musicians
Nerdcore artists
Wesleyan University alumni
Rappers from the San Francisco Bay Area
Web designers
21st-century American rappers